Andy Clockwise (born Andy Kelly) is an Australian-born musician, performer, writer, producer, and multi-instrumentalist currently residing in Los Angeles. Born in Sydney to an artistic family, Clockwise's music has been compared to LCD Soundsystem and Nick Cave and described as "refreshingly soulful and unabashedly experimental." He is well known for coming out of the nu-folk/ Indie rock movements of Sydney & Los Angeles and becoming a seminal indie Recording Artist & Performer Internationally, with support from Australian National Broadcater Triple J & Independent radio in Los Angeles like KROQFM, NPR & KCRW.

Clockwise is known for Indie Classics "Every Song" "Alice May" "Cocaine & Champagne" " The Casanova (Remember Love)" "Hopeless Featuring Holly Valance" "Open Relationship Feat. Stella Mozgawa" & "Dancing World" A live favorite at his shows.

Clockwise has headlined his own tours as well as supported artists such as Hugh Cornwell of The Stranglers, The Black Keys, Warpaint, The Adicts, The Wailers, and Julian Casablancas. In 2014, his single 'Hopeless' from the Dancing World EP, featuring Holly Valance, garnered Clockwise acclaim in the US as well as international coverage in the UK press, including The Guardian, The Daily Mail, and Digital Spy. His latest EP, The Good Book, was released on 8 April 2016 and features collaborations with Stella Mozgawa (Warpaint), JT Thomas (Captain Beefheart),  Holly Valance, and a guest appearance by John Hawkes.

Band history

2006–10: Classic FM and Tour
In 2004, Clockwise recorded a double concept album inspired by an imaginary radio station, Classic FM, which he wrote, produced, engineered, and mixed in his home studio. It was picked up as Triple J Feature Album and lead to him headlining his own national, sold-out tour.

2010–11:: Are You Well? & The Socialite 
Are You Well? was released as a promotional radio EP for the U.S. in 2010. The EP featured the single 'Love and War,' released through Australia's Triple j. To support the album, Clockwise toured with The Strokes front man Julian Casablancas. In February 2011, 'Love and War' was featured on an episode of the CW drama 90210.

In 2010, Clockwise released the studio album, The Socialite. In May 2011, "The Casanova (Remember Love)" was featured in an episode of CSI:Miami.

2012–2016 : EPs Dancing World and The Good Book
Clockwise released several singles in 2012, Clockwise released the EP Dancing World in 2014. The EP was a culmination of his experiences on the road and at home in the United States, and as Clockwise stated, "It's about the wars we put each other through...a pop musical ode to dysfunctionality." It mixed elements of folk and electronic music. In support of the EP, he toured with the likes of The Adicts and Warpaint, among others. The singles 'Steam Dream' and 'Murphy's Law' were in heavy rotation on LA's KROQ, Alt-98.7, and KCRW, and 'Hopeless,' featuring Holly Valance, received thousands of plays on SoundCloud. The EP's lead single "Dancing World" was circulated on specialty radio in LA and over 60 stations in North America, reaching #12 on the speciality FMQBY Radio Chart .

Starting in 2015, Clockwise has been doing DJ sets for "Dance Yourself Clean," LA's most popular indie dance party. During that time, he started recording songs between his Hollywood home studio, Australia, and London for what would become his latest EP, The Good Book, which he describes as "a celebration about the lies that we tell ourselves and an ode to the fleeting nature of existence."  In November 2015, the video for the EP's first single 'Open Relationship' premiered in Interview Magazine. Described as "LCD Soundsystem-meets-'80s disco and funk, " the single was inspired by a friend's real-life experience in a relationship. During the first half of 2016, Clockwise toured extensively across North America as a special guest for "Dance Yourself Clean," with sold-out shows in DC, San Francisco, Seattle, Atlanta, Brooklyn, and San Diego. In March, he was invited to play as part of an official showcase at South by Southwest Music Conference. The Good Book was released on 8 April 2016 through Exhibition Records; its latest single, 'The Best', "begins with a full synth bath" culminating in "existential and intimate utterances...illustrated among ear-worm keyboard hooks."

2017- Present: "War Stories" & Exhibition Records 
In 2017 Clockwise retreated from public life after the death of his mother and started penning a musical "The Moth Requiem" and working on a 4 Volume album "War Stories" that will be released in its entirety in 2023. It was orioginaly slated for a release with an extensive tour of the united states in 2020 but the 40 date tour was shut down due to the COVID-19 pandemic. 

Andy retreated to his farm outside of Sydney and started producing and writing for other artists during this period. 

War Stories is a several-volume odyssey spanning 36 tracks of classic pop/new wave/folk and 80’s post-punk. Made in his Hollywood Hills studio in LA and Boulevard Recording (Pink Floyd/Fleetwood Mac) as well as during stints in London and Sydney, it features work by Omar Yakar (War On Drugs) Drew Erickson (Tim Heidecker, Roger Waters, Lana Del Rey) JT Thomas (Captain Beefheart) Stella Mozgawa (Warpaint, Kurt Vile) and Jade Macrae. This will be accompanied by the re release of Andy's extensive catalogue to streaming services. 

In 2020/ 2022 Clockwise started teasing songs and videos to "War Stories" completely produced played and made by himself. He has soft Released 11 singles and remixes over that time that look like they will be on this upcoming album. Andy's entire catalogue on streaming services has been cleared it seems to make way for his upcoming releases plus possibly for his back catalogue in which fans have not been able to access for 5 years. 

Andy has announced a return to play live in the United States in March 2023

Music style
Andy Clockwise cites Charlie Chaplin, Bob Dylan, Tom Waits, Björk, The Pixies, David Bowie, and Nick Cave as influences.

Discography

Albums

Extended plays

Touring Musicians
Alisha Fraher – Bass, Guitar, Keys, Vocals
Jamie Douglass – Drums
Mathew Gardner - Drums
Stella Mozgawa - Drums
Josh Norton - Bass, Guitar, Keys, Vocals

References

External links
Official website

Living people
Australian musicians
Year of birth missing (living people)